The Macaulay Association Camanachd Cup (known as the  Artemis Macaulay Cup for sponsorship reasons) is a trophy in the Scottish sport of shinty.   It is competed for by the eight highest-placed league teams from the north and south areas of Scotland at the end of the previous season. The first winner of the cup, in 1947, was Newtonmore. 

It has been sponsored by investment management company Artemis since 2010. 

It is one of the five trophies that are considered to be part of the Grand Slam in the sport of shinty.

The current holders are Kingussie, who won their 25th title in 2021.

History

The MacAulay Cup was first presented in 1947 by Flora Macaulay, then editor of The Oban Times newspaper. The competition, uniquely in the sport is run outwith the auspices of the Camanachd Association, being administered by the Macaulay Association which also runs a junior six a-side competition before the final.

The final is played in Oban every year. It was the first ever summer tournament when shinty had a winter season, before the switch to summer play in 2004.  In 2006, worries about the fixture list being overcrowded led to the proposal of the Macaulay Cup becoming a match between the winners of the Mactavish Cup and the Glasgow Celtic Society Cup.  The Macaulay Association withdrew the cup from competition but the reintroduction of the competition in 2007 sparked debate about its place in the sport.

Inveraray won the cup 3–0 against Newtonmore on 23 August 2008.  The game was televised live on BBC2.  Inveraray again won the cup in 2009 coming back from 3–0 down to win the game 4–3 with a last minute goal by Grant Griffin.

Kingussie stopped Inveraray's attempt at a third consecutive title with a 4–2 win after extra time on 21 August 2010 thanks to 4 goals from Ronald Ross.

The top 8 in the south for 2012 was affected by Ballachulish's decision to drop a league, they were the eighth best team in the south (not counting Lochside Rovers who are technically a reserve team) in 2011. 

The 2012 final was played between Oban and Glenurquhart.  Glen defeated Oban 6–0.  In the aftermath of the final, the trophy was broken during celebrations.

Kingussie are the record holders with 25 wins, but Kyles Athletic moved into second place on the all time charts with 12 after beating Newtonmore with whom they were tied in the 2017 final.

Winners
2022 - Kingussie 3 Oban Camanachd 2
2021 - Kingussie 4 Kyles Athletic 1
2019 – Kingussie 3 Oban Camanachd 2
2018 – Kinlochshiel 3 Kyles Athletic 2
2017 – Kyles Athletic 7 Newtonmore 4
2016 – Kinlochshiel 5 Inveraray 3
2015 – Newtonmore 3 Inveraray 1
2014 – Newtonmore 2 Kyles Athletic 1 (a.e.t.)
2013 – Kyles Athletic 4 Newtonmore 3
2012 – Glenurquhart 6 Oban Camanachd 0
2011 – Kyles Athletic 2 Newtonmore 1
2010 – Kingussie 4 Inveraray 2 (a.e.t.)
2009 – Inveraray 4 Kingussie 3
2008 – Inveraray 3 Newtonmore 0
2007 – Kingussie 4 Inveraray 1
2006 – Not contested
2005 – Kingussie 6 Inveraray 3
2004 – Kingussie
2003 – Kingussie
2002 – Kingussie
2001 – Inveraray 3 Lochcarron 0
2000 –	Fort William
1999 –	Kingussie
1998 –	Kingussie
1997 –	Kingussie
1995 –	Oban Camanachd
1994 –	Kingussie
1993 – Oban Camanachd
1992 –	Kingussie
1991 –	Fort William
1990 –	Kingussie
1989 –	Kyles Athletic
1988 –	Kingussie
1987 –	Kingussie
1986 –	Newtonmore
1985 –	Newtonmore
1984 –	Kingussie
1983 –	Kingussie
1982 –	Kingussie
1981 –	Kingussie
1980 –	Newtonmore
1979 –	Newtonmore
1978 –	Kyles Athletic
1977 – Kyles Athletic 2 Glen Urquhart 0
1976 –	Newtonmore
1975 –	Newtonmore
1974 –	Kingussie
1973 –	Kingussie
1972 – Kyles Athletic 4 Glen Urquhart 0
1971 –	Kyles Athletic 2, Kingussie 1
1970 –	Kingussie
1969 –	Oban Celtic
1968 –	Kingussie
1967 –	Newtonmore
1966 –	Oban Celtic
1965 –	Kingussie
1964 –	Oban Celtic
1963 –	Kingussie
1962 –	Kyles Athletic
1961 –	Oban Celtic
1960 –	Kyles Athletic
1959 –	Furnace
1958 –	Kyles Athletic
1957 –	Oban Camanachd (8–3 most goals in a MacAulay Final)
1956 –	Kyles Athletic
1955 –	Inverness
1954 –	Oban Camanachd
1953 –	Lovat
1952 –	Oban Camanachd
1951 –	Kyles Athletic/Newtonmore final not played
1950 –	Oban Celtic
1949 –	Newtonmore
1948 –	Lovat
1947 –  Newtonmore 4 Ballachulish 1

Table of winners

References

External links
2008 Macaulay Cup Road to the Final
Am Baile – Picture of the Cup
BBC Slideshow in Scots Gaelic
Kinlochshiel historic win in 2016 in Scots Gaelic

Recurring sporting events established in 1947
1947 establishments in Scotland
Sports trophies and awards
Shinty competitions